Jerome Dillon is a professional musician, best known for his tenure as drummer with industrial rock group Nine Inch Nails from 1999–2005. After his departure, his own project, Nearly, released its debut album reminder in December 2005, along with a cd maxi-single for the song "Straight to Nowhere". "All is Lost", a song from reminder that Dillon co-wrote with 12 Rounds singer, Claudia Sarne, was featured in the 2008 film, Diary of a Nymphomaniac. In addition, an authorized limited release live bootleg EP/DVD entitled reminder Live 2006, was released in August 2006. Dillon has worked as a composer for feature films since 2001.

He was born July 16, 1969, in Columbus, Ohio and attended St. Francis DeSales and Northland High School until 1987.

In 1994, Dillon joined pop-rock band Howlin' Maggie. In July 1998, Dillon parted ways with the band and moved to Los Angeles. Later that year, while visiting family in Columbus, Dillon was advised by Howlin' Maggie's then manager, Sheila Scott, to audition for Trent Reznor's Nine Inch Nails. Reznor had since parted ways with long-time drummer and collaborator Chris Vrenna. Dillon submitted a sample of his work, and was contacted shortly after with the opportunity to audition for Reznor. Dillon was subsequently asked to return to New Orleans two weeks later. "I thought it was going to be the same thing all over again. Instead, I walked in and it was more of just a conversation with me and the band. Trent liked where I was coming from musically, and thought it was conducive to the direction of the new record". He was featured as the band's live drummer on tours in support of The Fragile and With Teeth. In addition, Dillon worked with Reznor in the studio as a multi-instrumentalist on subsequent releases: Things Falling Apart, And All That Could Have Been, Still, and With Teeth. His last appearance with the band was at the Hollywood Bowl, California, on October 1, 2005.

Discography

Nearly
 reminder (2005)
 Straight to Nowhere, CD maxi-single (2005)
 reminder Live, 8 Track live CD/DVD, no longer available (2006)

Records featuring Jerome Dillon
 Honeysuckle Strange (Howlin' Maggie, 1996)
 EdgeFest 96 Live (Various Artists, 1996)
 The Fragile (Nine Inch Nails album), 1999)
 Things Falling Apart (Nine Inch Nails, 2000)
 Cecil B. Demented OST (2000)
 And All That Could Have Been DVD, cd (Nine Inch Nails, 2002)
 Still  (Nine Inch Nails, 2002)
 With Teeth (Nine Inch Nails, 2005)
 Amber Headlights (Greg Dulli, 2005)
 Jagged (Gary Numan, 2006)
 Beside You in Time (Nine Inch Nails, 2007)

Soundtrack
 Cecil B. Demented, soundtrack (RCA Records 2000)
 Bully, composer (Lions Gate Films 2001)
 Vacancy 2: The First Cut, composer (Sony Pictures, Screen Gems 2008)
 The Collector, composer (Liddell Entertainment, Fortress Features 2009)
 For The Love of Money, composer (All Cash Productions 2011)
 No One Lives, composer (WWE, Pathe 2013)
 Officer Down, composer (Most Films 2013)
 Bleed, composer (Spitfire Productions 2014)
 The Green Fairy, composer (Upward Rising Development 2016)

Further appearances
 And All That Could Have Been DVD (Nine Inch Nails, 2002)
 arhythmiA: Drums & Drones (CD-ROM, Sony, 2004)
 Android Lust – The Human Animal ("God in the Hole" remix) (Synthellec Music 2010)

External links
 And All That Could Have Been
 Nine Inch Nails

1969 births
Living people
American industrial musicians
Nine Inch Nails members
Musicians from Columbus, Ohio
20th-century American drummers
American male drummers